Dwaraka is a 2017 Indian Telugu-language comedy-drama film directed by  Srinivas Ravindra (MSR), produced by Pradyumna Chandrapati and Ganesh Penubotu, under Legend Cinema, and is presented by R. B. Choudary under the banner Super Good Films. It features Vijay Deverakonda and Pooja Jhaveri in the lead roles while Prakash Raj, Prudhviraj and Murali Sharma appear in crucial roles. The movie was set to release in November 2016 but due to demonitisation was released on March 3, 2017. The movie received poor word of mouth and failed at the box office.

Plot 
The story is about a thief Erra Srinu who turns into a fake Baba due to circumstances, how is his image exploited, his love story with Vasudha and his fight with a rationalist Chaitanya and how he comes clean forms the rest of the story.

Cast 
 Vijay Deverakonda as Erra Srinu / Sri Krishnananda Swamy
 Pooja Jhaveri as Vasudha
 Prakash Raj as CM
 Prudhviraj as Pujari
 Murali Sharma as Chaitanya
 Prabhakar as 'Broker' Ravi
 Surekha Vani
 Raghu Babu as Minister 
 Krishna Bhagavaan
 Gundu Sudarshan as Sudarshan
 Uttej as Journalist Gopi
 Venkata Giridhar Vajja as Giri
 Shakalaka Shankar
 Niharica Raizada in a special appearance in the song "Alabbi Alabbi"

Soundtrack
The soundtrack was released by Aditya Music in October 2016. Music is composed by Sai Karthik.

Reception 
A critic from The Hindu wrote that "With a predictable storyline there is nothing in the film that keeps you amused or engaged. Dwaraka disappoints".

References

External links
 
 

2017 films
2010s Telugu-language films
Films shot in Telangana
Indian drama films
Films scored by Sai Karthik